Jack Dempsey (born 12 April 1994) is a Scotland international rugby union player. He is of Scottish descent and currently plays for Glasgow Warriors in the United Rugby Championship. His regular playing position is either as a flanker or number eight.

Club rugby

Australia

Dempsey played for Gordon. He helped the club win the 2020 Shute Shield.
Dempsey played domestically in Australia for the  who compete in the National Rugby Championship.

Glasgow
Dempsey moved to Scotland in 2021 to play for Glasgow Warriors. He has relatives in the city, as his grandfather emigrated to Glasgow from Australia. Of the move to the Warriors, Dempsey stated:
The history that Glasgow has with fast-paced footie – with quick ruck speed – is something which very much suits my game. So, it is kind of a combination of wanting a character like me to add depth and being that tool in the tool chest within the back-row, but also I do suit the identity and style that Glasgow want to play as well.

Dempsey made his debut for Glasgow in the 'Clash of the Warriors' pre-season fixture with Worcester, with Glasgow winning the inaugural cup 27 - 22. He made his competitive debut for Glasgow in the 24 September 2021 match against Ulster away at Ravenhill Stadium in the United Rugby Championship - earning the Glasgow Warrior No. 331.

At the end of a successful season Dempsey was awarded The XVIth Warrior Player of the Year award by the official supporters club.

International rugby

Dempsey represented Australia at schoolboy and under-20 level. He was capped for  against , coming off the bench at Lang Park in Brisbane on 24 June 2017. Dempsey was a member of the Wallabies 2019 Rugby World Cup squad which were knocked out in the quarter-finals in Japan, but did not play for Australia after that.

After a three-year stand-down period from international rugby, Dempsey made his debut for Scotland on 29th October 2022 against Australia, the country he previously played for.

References

External links
 

1994 births
Living people
Australian rugby union players
Australia international rugby union players
Rugby union flankers
Rugby union number eights
New South Wales Waratahs players
Sydney (NRC team) players
Rugby union players from Sydney
People educated at Saint Ignatius' College, Riverview
Glasgow Warriors players
Scottish rugby union players
Scotland international rugby union players